Tai Dam, also known as Black Tai ("Black Tai language"), is a Tai language spoken by the Tai Dam in Vietnam, Laos, Thailand, and China (mostly in Jinping Miao, Yao, and Dai Autonomous County).

The Tai Dam language is similar to Thai and Lao (including Isan), but it is not close enough to be readily understood by most Thai and Lao (Isan) speakers. In particular, the Khmer, Pali and Sanskrit additions to Thai and Lao (Isan) are largely missing from Tai Dam.

Geographical distribution
Tai Dam is spoken in Vietnam, China, Laos, and Thailand. In central Thailand, it is known as Thai Song.

Tai Dam speakers in China are classified as part of the Dai nationality along with almost all the other Tai peoples. But in Vietnam they are given their own nationality (with the White Tai) where they are classified (confusingly for English speakers) as the Thái nationality (meaning Tai people).

In China, Tai Dam people are located in the following townships of Yunnan, with about 20,000 people in Yunnan (Gao 1999).
Maguan County 马关县: Muchang Township 木厂乡, Dalishu Township 大栗树乡, and Pojiao Township 坡脚乡
Wenshan County 文山县: Dehou Township 德厚乡, Panzhihua Township 攀枝花乡
Hekou County 河口县: Qiaotou Town 桥头镇 (in Baihei Village 白黑村 and Gantianzhai 甘田寨)
Yuanjiang County 元江县: Dashuiping Township 大水平乡 (in Gaozhai 高寨 and Yangmahe 养马河)

Official status
In Vietnam, all Tai peoples are taught a standardized Tai language based on the Tai Dam language, using the standardized Tai Viet script.

Phonology

Consonants

Initials 

 Sounds  and  can fluctuate to voiced implosive sounds , .  may also fluctuate to a lateral sound .  can fluctuate to sounds .
 In some rare cases  can be realized as a  sound.

Finals 

 Final plosive sounds  can be realized as unreleased .

Vowels 

 There is also  that corresponds to Proto-Tai *aɰ.
  can tend to fluctuate to a more open sound .
  fluctuates to a back unrounded sound .

Vocabulary
The Khmer, Pali and Sanskrit additions to Thai and Lao (Isan) are generally absent from Tai Dam. Tai Dam lacks many of the Khmer and Indic (via Khmer) loanwords found in Thai, Lao and Isan.
{| class="wikitable" 
|+ Lack of Khmer and Indic (via Khmer) loan words in Tai Dam
! colspan="4" | Khmer loan word
! colspan="2" | Isan
! colspan="2" | Lao
! colspan="2" | Thai
! colspan="2" | Tai Dam
! Gloss
|-
| colspan="3" | ទន្លេtônlé
| /tɔːn leː/
| ทะเลthale
| /tʰāʔ léː/
| ທະເລthalé
| /tʰāʔ léː/
| ทะเลthale
| /tʰáʔ leː/
| noang luang
| /nɔŋ˨.luə̯ŋ˨/
| 'sea'
|-
| colspan="3" | រៀនreăn
| /riən/
| เฮียนhian
| /híːən/
| ຮຽນhian
| /híːən/
| เรียนrian
| /riːən/
| ʼaep
| /ʔɛp̚˦˥/
| 'to learn'
|-
| भाषाbhāṣā
| /bʱaːʂaː/
| ភាសាpheăsa
| /pʰiə saː/
| ภาษาphasa| /pʰáː săː/
| ພາສາphasa| /pʰáː săː/
| ภาษาphasa| /pʰaː sǎː/
| kwaam| /kʷaːm˥/
| 'language'
|-
| राजrāja| /raːdʒaː/
| រាជាreăcheă| /riə ɕiə/
| ราชาracha| /láː tɕʰáː/
| ຣາຊາraxa| /láː sáː/
| ราชาracha| /raː tɕʰaː/
| pua| /puə̯˨/
| 'king'
|-
| वेलाvelā| /ʋe laː/
| វេលាvéreǎ| /veː liːə/
| เวลาvela| /wéː láː/
| ເວລາvéla| /ʋéː láː/
| เวลาwela| /weː laː/
| nyaam| /ɲaːm˥/
| 'time'
|-
| colspan="3" | សប្បាយsǎpbay| /sap baːj/
| สบายsabai| /sáʔ baːj/
| ສບາຽ/ສະບາຍsabay| /sáʔ baːj/
| สบายsabai| /saʔ baːj/
| xan doa| /xan˧˩.dɔː˨/
| 'to be well'
|-
| colspan="3" | រាក់raek| /raːk/
| ฮักhak| /hak/
| ຮັກhak| /hak/
| รักrak| /rák/
| hak| /hak˥/
| 'love'
|}
 Khmer tônlé generally signifies 'lake' or 'large canal'.  Similarly, the Tai Dam term for the sea means 'large lake'.
 Sanskrit source of following Khmer word. Thai and Lao adopted Sanskrit terms via Khmer, but restored their vowels pronunciations.
 The term rak was borrowed from Proto-Mon-Khmer *r[a]k meaning 'to love, beloved, dear' although now the term raek'' means 'friendly, cordial, pleasant; intimate, affectionate' in modern Khmer.

Grammar

Pronouns 

For the word "I"
 When addressing parents the word ꪩꪴ꪿ꪀ (luk5) is used instead.
 When addressing grandparents the word ꪨꪰꪣ (laam1) is used instead.

For the word "my"
 When addressing parents the word ꪄꪮꪉ ꪩꪴ꪿ꪀ (khhɔng1 luk5) is used instead.
 When addressing grandparents the word ꪄꪮꪉ ꪨꪰꪣ (khhɔng1 laam1) is used instead.

Syntax 
Tai Dam uses an SVO word order.

Writing system

The Tai Dam language has its own system of writing, called Tai Viet, which consists of 31 consonants and 14 vowels. At the beginning, there was no tone marker although the language is tonal. Tone markers emerge in the 1970s in two sets: combining marks like Thai/Lao, and modifiers like New Tai Lue/Tai Nuea which are now less popular. According to Thai authors, the writing system is probably derived from the old Thai writing of the kingdom of Sukhotai.

Further reading
Miyake, Marc. 2014. Black and white evidence for Vietnamese phonological history.
Miyake, Marc. 2014. *(C).r-usters in Black Tai and Bao Yen.
Miyake, Marc. 2014.  S-implificaition in Black Tai and Bao Yen.

References

External links 
 Tai Dam alphabet
 Tai Dam Language, Literature, and Culture
 SIL Tai Heritage Pro fonts
 Basic Tai Dam phrases
 Tai Viet script notes

Southwestern Tai languages
Languages of Vietnam
Languages of Laos
Languages of China
Languages of Thailand